Zhao Jing (born December 31, 1990) is a Chinese former competitive swimmer, backstroke specialist, and world record-holder.  Zhao swam at the 2008 Summer Olympics and 2012 Summer Olympics, winning a bronze medal in the women's 4x100-meter medley relay in 2008.  She has also won gold medals as a member of Chinese teams at the 2009, 2011 and 2013 World Aquatics Championships, and the 2010 short course world championships.  She also won individual world titles in the 50-meter backstroke in 2009, 2010, 2012 and 2013, and the 100-meter backstroke in 2011.

Records
2006 Asian Championships – 28.50, 50 m back (AR)
2008 National Champions Tournament & Olympic Selective Trials – 59.81, 100 m back (AR)
2009 FINA World Championships – 3.52.19, 4×100 m medley relay
2009 FINA World Cup Stockholm – 26.08 50 m backstroke short course world record

See also
 World record progression 50 metres backstroke

References

 

1990 births
Living people
Chinese female backstroke swimmers
Chinese female medley swimmers
Swimmers from Wuhan
Olympic bronze medalists for China
Olympic swimmers of China
Swimmers at the 2008 Summer Olympics
World record setters in swimming
Olympic bronze medalists in swimming
World Aquatics Championships medalists in swimming
Swimmers at the 2012 Summer Olympics
Medalists at the FINA World Swimming Championships (25 m)
Asian Games medalists in swimming
Swimmers at the 2006 Asian Games
Swimmers at the 2010 Asian Games
Medalists at the 2008 Summer Olympics
Asian Games gold medalists for China
Asian Games silver medalists for China
Asian Games bronze medalists for China
Medalists at the 2006 Asian Games
Medalists at the 2010 Asian Games
21st-century Chinese women